The 2005–06 Ekstraklasa season started on 24 July 2005 and ended 13 May 2006. Legia Warsaw were crowned champions after ending Wisła Kraków's three season winning streak. This was Legia's first title since 2002.

League table

Results

Relegation playoffs 
The matches were played on 14 and 18 June 2006.

Top goalscorers

References 

Ekstraklasa seasons
Poland
1